The Lanier County School District is a public school district in Lanier County, Georgia, United States, based in Lakeland. It serves the communities of Lakeland and Stockton.

Schools
The Lanier County School District has one primary school, one elementary school, one middle school, and one high school.
Lanier County Primary School
Lanier County Elementary School
Lanier County Middle School
Lanier County High School

References

External links

School districts in Georgia (U.S. state)
Education in Lanier County, Georgia